Cerberiopsis candelabra is a species of plant in the family Apocynaceae. It is endemic to New Caledonia. Unlike most trees, the species is monocarpic, flowering only once in its lifetime before dying.

References 

Endemic flora of New Caledonia
candelabra
Plants described in 1874